The Self-Realization Fellowship Encinitas Retreat, Hermitage, and Meditation Gardens is a spiritual retreat, monastic ashram, and meditation gardens in Encinitas, California, United States created by Paramahansa Yogananda. Its golden lotus towers rise above the white wall along Highway 101 near Swami's Seaside Park.

History 

After his return to the United States from India in 1936, Paramahansa Yogananda took up residence in the SRF hermitage in Encinitas which was a surprise gift from his disciple Rajarsi Janakananda. It was while staying in the hermitage that Yogananda wrote his work Autobiography of a Yogi, as well as other writings and created a permanent foundation for the spiritual and humanitarian work of the Self-Realization Fellowship/ Yogoda Satsanga Society of India. 

The Golden Lotus Temple lost to cliff erosion in 1942. According to Yogananda Site, it was written in the Inner Culture magazine that Yogananda announced, "The crucifixion of Golden Lotus Temple must be the cause for its resurrection and the birth of many other such temples." Two other temples were immediately "born" - the Hollywood Self-Realization Church of all Religions and the Self Realization Fellowship San Diego Temple.

See also
 Self-Realization Fellowship Lake Shrine

References

External links

 Official page of the Self-Realization Fellowship: Encinitas Temple.
 Official page of the Self-Realization Fellowship: Encinitas Retreat

1936 establishments in California
Gardens in California
Paramahansa Yogananda
Religious buildings and structures in San Diego County, California
Religious organizations established in 1920